The Beach 25th Street station (signed as Beach 25th Street–Wavecrest station) is a station on the IND Rockaway Line of the New York City Subway, located in Queens on the Rockaway Freeway at Beach 25th Street. It is served by the A train at all times. There are two tracks and two side platforms.

History

The station was originally opened by the Long Island Rail Road in May 1928 as Wavecrest Station, and was closed and relocated 800 feet east of the former location in August 1940 as part of a grade elevation project. The elevated station was opened on April 10, 1942, but was closed on October 3, 1955. It was purchased by the New York City Transit Authority along with the rest of the line west to Rockaway Park, which reopened it as a subway station on June 28, 1956. This station was the terminal for the Far Rockaway branch until the opening of Far Rockaway–Mott Avenue station on January 16, 1958.

Station layout

This station is on a concrete viaduct with ballasted track.

Exits
Exit is near the center to the tiled mezzanine. The mezzanine is four stories high. Three stairs lead to the street, two to the southwestern corner and one to the northwestern corner of Rockaway Freeway and Beach 25th Street.

References

External links 

 
 Station Reporter — A Rockaway
 The Subway Nut — Beach 25th Street–Wavecrest Pictures 
 Beach 25th Street entrance from Google Maps Street View
 Platforms from Google Maps Street View

IND Rockaway Line stations
Rockaway, Queens
New York City Subway stations in Queens, New York
Railway stations in the United States opened in 1956
1956 establishments in New York City